TM65 is a rocket engine developed by Copenhagen Suborbitals. TM65 uses Ethanol and liquid oxygen as propellants in a pressure-fed power cycle.

Development
Construction of the prototype rocket engine TM65 was started in 2010, completed in the spring of 2012 and test fired in May and November 2012. It is planned to change the engine to be fed by a turbine pump.

Description
The TM65 uses a 75% ethanol/water mixture for fuel and liquid oxygen (LOX) for oxidizer. It has a regeneratively cooled nozzle.
Nitrogen was used in the first tests to pressurize the propellant tanks, heated in a heat exchanger in the nozzle.

TM65 Engine Specifications 
 Power Cycle: Gas-generator (initially pressure-fed)
Propellants
 Oxidizer: Liquid Oxygen
 Fuel (by volume): 75% Alcohol, 25% Water
 Fuel (by mass): 63% Ethyl alcohol, 7% Isopropyl alcohol, 30% Water
 O/F Ratio: 1.3
Cooling
 Combustion Chamber: Regenerative
 Nozzle: Regenerative & Film cooling
 15% of fuel flow is directed to nozzle film cooling via 2 x 7.3 mm tubes, injected via 56 x 2.0 mm orifices
Injector
 Impingement Type: Like-on-like
 Fuel Ports: 100 x 2.5 mm holes; 50 pairs
 Oxidizer Ports: 132 x 2.5 mm holes; 66 pairs
Cooling Jacket
 Type: Annular
 Nozzle Flowspeed: 5.4 m/s
 Chamber Flowspeed: 2.5 m/s
Combustion Chamber
 Specific Length (L*): 2.0 m
 Nozzle Throat Area: 450 cm
 Nozzle Exit Area: 1963 cm
 Nozzle Expansion Ratio: 4.36
Nominal Operating Data
 Chamber Pressure at 100% Rated Thrust: 12.0 bars
 Nominal Sea Level Thrust: 65 kN @ Cf 1.2
 Nominal Sea Level ISP: 200 s
 Nominal Vacuum ISP: 235 s

TM65 Turbopump Specifications 
Liquid Oxygen Pump
 Type: Centrifugal
 Power Method: Single stage impulse turbine
 Rotation Frequency: 4300 rpm
 Inlet Pressure: 2 bars
 Outlet Pressure: 20 bars
 Flow: 20 kg/s
 Power Consumption: 50 kW
Fuel Pump
 Type: Centrifugal
 Power Method: Single stage impulse turbine
 Rotation Frequency: 6200 rpm
 Inlet Pressure: 2 bars
 Outlet Pressure: 20 bars
 Flow: 15 kg/s
 Power Consumption: 50 kW
Gas Generator
 Propellant: 80% HO
 Catalyst: KMnO solid
 Propellant Mass Flow: 0.45 kg/s
 Gas Components: Steam, Oxygen
 Gas Temperature: 275 °C
 Gas Pressure: 25 bars

The turbopump is controlled by an electronic controller which measures outlet pressure and RPM, adjusting HO flow as necessary. Each of the two turbine & pump units have a gas generator, and the units are mounted back to back but rotate in opposite directions and at different speeds.

History
Construction of the prototype rocket engine Tordenskjold 65 (TM65) was started in the fall of 2010 after a range of successful tests with its predecessor XLR-3A. The project was run parallel to Copenhagen Suborbitals hybrid rocket engine project that was used to power the HEAT-1X rocket and its payload Tycho Brahe.

After a few months of development the project was halted to focus on the launch of HEAT-1X in the summer of 2011.

The development and testing of TM65 was restarted in 2012 to explore if it was a viable replacement for the hybrid engine that Copenhagen Suborbitals previously had favored.
Construction of the first prototype TM65 engine was completed in the spring of 2012 and successfully test fired in May 2012. Tests were planned and executed throughout the fall and winter of 2012 in an attempt to raise chamber pressure to the planned 12 bars, which should produce 65 kN of thrust.

See also
 HEAT 1X Rocket

References

External links
 TM65 Liquid propellant rocket engine
 Copenhagen Suborbitals explaining the TM65 on youtube.com
 TM65 Description on ing.dk (Danish)

Rocket engines using the gas-generator cycle
Rocket engines using alcohol propellant